Hemswell is a village and civil parish in the West Lindsey district of Lincolnshire, England. According to the 2001 Census it had a population of 309.

In Domesday Hemswell is written as "Helmeswelle", a settlement of 37 households, which before 1086 was under the lordship of Earl Edwin.

Aerial photographs have shown ancient medieval settlement on the edge of the village, and 18th-century enclosure maps indicate a larger village area than now exists and the site of a medieval church.  earthworks have been defined through crop markings and hollow ways, ditched enclosures, embankments and foundations of buildings that indicate the existence of crofts.

Hemswell Grade II* listed Anglican parish church is dedicated to All Saints. Originating in the 13th century it was partially rebuilt in 1764, when a new tower was added, and in 1858, when the rest of the church was replaced. An internal Early English three-bay north arcade remains, as does a 13th-century Decorated sedilia on the south wall of the chancel. The font bears the arms of the Monson family. A further listed church, St Edmund's on Spital-in-the-Street Road, is a converted 16th-century quarter sessions court house.

Opposite the churchyard is a 19th-century maypole of wood and wrought iron with painted red white and blue stripes. It is one of the oldest in England, and danced round each May Day during the village May Day Fete. On Church Street is the listed early 19th-century Post Office, now non-operational, and Manor Farmhouse, originally 17th-century. On Spital-in-the-Street Road is the early 17th-century Spital Almshouse, now a cottage, and its barn, previously a hospice.

RAF Hemswell was located just outside the village from 1937 until it closed in 1967. The site and buildings were subsequently redeveloped into a private trading estate which became the new civil parish of Hemswell Cliff.

References

External links

"Hemswell", Genuki.org.uk. Retrieved 14 October 2011
Hemswell Parish Council, Parishes.lincolnshire.gov.uk. Retrieved 14 October 2011

Villages in Lincolnshire
Civil parishes in Lincolnshire
West Lindsey District